Servant Air, Inc. is an American regional airline with operations throughout The United States and Alaska, USA. It operates domestic scheduled passenger and charter services. Its main scheduled airline service base is Kodiak Airport (PADQ) with regional operations bases in Boston, Massachusetts, White Plains, New York, and Manassas Virginia.

History
The airline was established as Paklook Air in the spring of 1992 in Fairbanks, Alaska and began service with single engine commuter aircraft. Originally, the airline fleet consisted of a Cessna 185 Floatplanes,  Cessna 206 and Cessna 207, Piper Lance, and Britten Norman Islander wheel aircraft. The current fleet consists of King Air 200's and King Air 100's operating scheduled and charter service to multiple villages on Kodiak Island and the Southcentral and Southeast regions of Alaska. Servant Air also provides scheduled air service between Westchester County Airport (KHPN) and Boston Logan International Airport (KBOS) under the Beacon Air brand using King Air 200 aircraft.

Hubs 
The Servant Air main hub is located at Kodiak State Airport in Kodiak, Alaska. Facilities at the Kodiak hub include a terminal, a heavy maintenance facility, and a hangar. Servant air also has hubs at Anchorage International Airport and Washington Executive Airport. Seasonally, Servant air operates at Westchester County Airport, Boston Logan International Airport and Fort Lauderdale Executive Airport.

Fleet

The Servant Air fleet includes Cessna 208 Caravan, Cessna 208B Grand Caravan, King Air 200, and King Air 100 aircraft.

Destinations
Servant Air offers scheduled passenger service to the following destinations in Alaska:
 Akhiok (AKK) - Akhiok Airport
 Kodiak (ADQ) - Kodiak Airport (hub)
 Old Harbor (OLH) - Old Harbor Airport
 Ouzinkie (KOZ) - Ouzinkie Airport
 Port Lions (ORI) - Port Lions Airport

Servant Air also offers unscheduled on-demand passenger service in Alaska to:
Anchorage (ANC) - Anchorage international Airport [not scheduled]
Fairbanks (FAI) - Fairbanks International Airport 
Juneau (JNU) - Juneau International Airport
Kenai (ENI) - Kenai Airport
Karluk (KYK) - Karluk Airport [not scheduled]
Homer (HOM) - Homer Airport [not scheduled]
King Salmon (AKN) - King Salmon Airport
Unalaska (DUT) - Dutch Harbor Airport
 Larsen Bay (KLN) - Larsen Bay Airport [not scheduled]

Servant Air seasonal scheduled passenger service:
 White Plains (HPN) - Westchester County Airport
 Boston (BOS) - Logan International Airport
Weyers Cave (SHD) - Shenandoah Valley Regional Airport
 Dulles (IAD) - Washington Dulles International Airport

Incidents 
On January 6, 2008, Servant Air Flight 109 crashed just short of Kodiak Airport shortly after takeoff, en route to Homer, Alaska. Of the 9 passengers and the pilot aboard the Piper Navajo Chieftain, there were 4 survivors. According to the NTSB, the failure of the nose baggage door latching mechanism resulted in an inadvertent opening of the nose baggage door in flight. Contributing to the accident was the lack of information and guidance available to the operator and pilot regarding procedures to follow should a baggage door open in flight and cause an inadvertent aerodynamic stall.

References

External links

 

2003 establishments in Alaska
Airlines established in 2003
Airlines based in Alaska
Companies based in Alaska
Kodiak Island Borough, Alaska
Regional airlines of the United States